Yan Peng (born 27 May 1995) is a Chinese footballer who currently plays for Dalian Duxing.

Club career
Yan Peng joined Dalian Aerbin's youth academy in 2013 after Dalian Shide's dissolve. He was then loaned to China League Two side Liaoning Youth. On 12 May 2013, he scored his first senior goal in a 3–3 home draw with Shenyang Dongjin. In 2016, Yan was loaned to China League Two club Shenyang Urban for one season. On 23 April 2016, he made his debut in a 0–0 away draw against Baoding Yingli ETS, coming on as a substitute for Yang Jian in the half time. On 30 April 2016, he scored his first goal for the club in a 2–0 home win over Shenyang Dongjin. He scored 9 goals in 18 appearances in the 2016 season.

Yan returned to Dalian Yifang in 2017 and was promoted to the first team. On 20 April 2017, he made his debut for the club in a 2017 Chinese FA Cup match against Jiangsu Yancheng Dingli. He did not play in the league match and followed the club promote back to the Chinese Super League. He made his Super League debut on 14 April 2018 in a 2–0 away defeat to Shandong Luneng Taishan, coming on for Zhu Ting in the 77th minute.

Career statistics

Honours

Club
Dalian Yifang
China League One: 2017

References

External links
 

1995 births
Living people
Chinese footballers
Sportspeople from Anshan
Footballers from Liaoning
Liaoning Shenyang Urban F.C. players
Dalian Professional F.C. players
Heilongjiang Ice City F.C. players
Chinese Super League players
China League One players
China League Two players
Association football forwards